Rolf Lüders Schwarzenberg (born October 1, 1935 in Santiago) is a Chilean economist, entrepreneur, scholar, politician, and former Minister of State of the military dictatorship of Augusto Pinochet. He is son of Jürgen Lüders, leading mountaineer of the  Club Alemán Andino (German Andean Club).

Lüders is a member of the Chicago Boys.

Education 
Lüders studied at the Universidad Católica. He graduated in Commercial Engineering in 1958 and received the Hamel Prize awarded to the best Commercial Engineer that graduated in Chile that year.

Career 
As a member of the Chicago Boys, he took part in the economic direction of Chile during the Augusto Pinochet government. Before assuming as Minister of Economy in 1982, he had worked for the Vial Group, one of the most powerful economic groups of the time in Chile, managing the Banco de Chile for that group, while being Banco Hipotecario de Chile's vice president of the Board until August 1982. However, as Minister of Economy, he had to supervise the  takeover of the Bank of Chile, after the breakdown and liquidation of Grupo Vial during the economic crisis of 1981–1982.

Subsequently, Lüders, among other Grupo Vial executives, was imprisoned for his participation in illegal financial transactions during his work for Banco de Chile and Banco Hipotecario de Chile. In 1983, he was convicted of fraud and violation of the General Banking Law, with a penalty of five years and one day in jail, and the payment of  about US$165 million in compensation to the State.  However, in 2002 the Court of Appeals of Chile acquitted Lüders on the grounds that "there is no background to establish criminal responsibility", which was confirmed by the Supreme Court in 2005. Therefore, Lüders was free from any responsibility.

Political career 
He was Minister of Finance and Economy, Development and Reconstruction in the period (1982-1983).

References 

Chilean anti-communists
People from Santiago
University of Chicago alumni
Pontifical Catholic University of Chile alumni
20th-century Chilean economists
Chilean Ministers of Finance
1935 births
Living people
20th-century Chilean politicians
Chilean people of German descent